Marett is a surname, and may refer to:

 Carol Marett (born 1944), former New Zealand international cricketer
 Graeme Marett, New Zealand Paralympic athlete
 Sir Robert Pipon Marett (1820–1884), Jersey lawyer, journalist, poet, politician
 Robert Ranulph Marett (1866–1943), British ethnologist, son of Robert Pipon Marett
 Robert Marett (diplomat) (1907–1981), British author and diplomat

See also
 Maret (name)

French-language surnames